Sri Raja Rajeswara Temple is one of the most famous Hindu temples in Telangana, India, dedicated to Lord Shiva. It is located in the town of Vemulawada, Telangana, India. Historically the region was the capital of the Vemulawada Chalukyas who ruled from 750 to 973 CE.

Temple
This temple of Shiva in the form of Raja Rajeswara Swami is very famous in this part of the region. The presiding deity of the temple is Sri Raja Rajeswara Swamy who is locally popular as Rajanna who is adorned on both sides by the idol of Sri Raja Rajeswari Devi on the right side and to the left is the idol of Sri Laxmi Sahitha Siddi Vinayaka.

Vemulawada Raja Rajeswara temple is situated 38  km from Karimnagar.  This famous temple dedicated to Lord Rajarajeswara Swamy draws pilgrims in large numbers. Pilgrims have a divine bath in a holy tank called Dharma Gundam, before proceeding for darshan and these holy waters are believed to have medicinal properties. Every year at the time of Maha Sivarathri, devotees in large numbers flock to Vemulawada, to offer prayers to Lord Shiva. This temple also has a very special offering made by devotees called' Kode Mokku'. Kode Mokku is a ritual where the devotee makes the pradakshinam of the temple with a kode (bull) which is vahanam (Nandi) of Lord Shiva. Inside is a massive Siva Linga.

References

http://www.vemulawadatemple.org/about

Shiva temples in Telangana
Hindu temples in Karimnagar district
Hindu temples in Telangana